William Roberts (5 April 1912 – 5 December 2001) was an English sprinter and winner of gold medal in 4x400 m relay for Great Britain at the 1936 Summer Olympics.

At the 1934 British Empire Games, Roberts finished second in  behind Godfrey Rampling, but turned the silver into the gold medal in the next British Empire Games in 1938 in Sydney, Australia. He also won a silver in 4x440 yd relay event and finished sixth in the 220 yards contest.

At the Berlin Olympics, Roberts just missed the medal in the individual 400-metre event, finishing fourth in the final, and ran the third leg in the gold medal-winning British 4x400 m relay team.

After World War II and service in the RAF, Roberts returned to athletics to win the silver medal as a member of British 4x400 m relay team at the 1946 European Championships.

At the 1948 Summer Olympics, Roberts was chosen as Great Britain's athletics team captain, but he was eliminated in the heats of the 400-metre event and anchored the British relay team to a fourth place in their heat of the 4×400-metre competition.

After his retirement from athletics in 1949, he worked as a columnist for the Manchester Evening News. William Roberts died in Timperley, Manchester, aged 89.

Competition record

References

External links 
 

1912 births
2001 deaths
English male sprinters
British male sprinters
Olympic athletes of Great Britain
Athletes (track and field) at the 1936 Summer Olympics
Athletes (track and field) at the 1948 Summer Olympics
English Olympic medallists
Olympic gold medallists for Great Britain
Athletes (track and field) at the 1934 British Empire Games
Athletes (track and field) at the 1938 British Empire Games
Commonwealth Games gold medallists for England
Commonwealth Games silver medallists for England
Sportspeople from Salford
Commonwealth Games medallists in athletics
European Athletics Championships medalists
Medalists at the 1936 Summer Olympics
Olympic gold medalists in athletics (track and field)
Royal Air Force personnel of World War II
Medallists at the 1934 British Empire Games
Medallists at the 1938 British Empire Games